L. maritima may refer to:
 Lasthenia maritima, the maritime goldfield, a flowering plant species
 Lobularia maritima, the sweet alyssum or sweet alison, a plant species

See also
 Maritima (disambiguation)